Abo is an Arabic and Hebrew male name and a variant form of Abbas. It is from Abbas that Abo takes its meaning of stern or somber father. In Arabic, Abbas is a symbolic name referring to the lion, the king of beasts.

The variant used in the Russian language as a Christian name is "" (Abo). It is possible that the Russian name was derived from the Biblical Hebrew word meaning father, but it is also possible that it was derived from av, the name of a Hebrew month.

In the United States, according to the 2000 U.S. Census Abo is an uncommon first name but a fairly common last name for both men and women; ranking 53,205 out of 88,799.

People with the given name Abo
Abo El Seoud El Ebiary (1910–1969), Egyptian screenwriter
Abo of Tiflis (ca. 756–786), 8th-Century Christian martyr

People with the surname Abo
Kiyokazu Abo (1870–1948), Imperial Japanese Navy Admiral during World War I
Léonie Abo (born 1945), Congolese writer
 (living), Japanese video game musician
Maryam d'Abo (born 1960), English television and film actress
Mike d'Abo (born 1944), English singer-songwriter, cousin of Maryam
Olivia d'Abo (born 1969), actress; daughter of Mike, above
Lady Ursula d'Abo (1916–2017); English socialite

See also
Abu Hafs Umar ibn Shuayb al-Iqritishi, 9th-century Spanish explorer and member of the Muslim clergy

References

Notes

Sources
А. В. Суперанская (A. V. Superanskaya). "Словарь русских имён" (Dictionary of Russian Names). Издательство Эксмо. Москва, 2005. 

Arabic masculine given names
Japanese-language surnames
Hebrew masculine given names